Richard Ruoff (18 August 1883 – 30 March 1967) was a general in the Wehrmacht of Nazi Germany during World War II. He commanded the 4th Panzer Army and the 17th Army on the Eastern Front.

World War II
Ruoff took command of V Army Corps on 1 May 1939, and led this unit into World War II. He also concurrently commanded V Wehrkreis in Stuttgart. Ruoff then was given command of the 4th Panzer Army from 8 January 1942 to 31 May 1942. The 4th Panzer Army was part of Army Group A which was formed when Army Group South was split into two formations for the summer offensive of 1942.

Ruoff commanded the 17th Army from 1 June 1942 to 24 June 1943. The 17th Army was also part of Army Group A.  Ruoff was the commander of the 17th Army when, on 3 June 1942, the Italian Expeditionary Corps in Russia (CSIR) was briefly subordinated to it. From June to July, the German 17th Army, the CSIR, and the Romanian 3rd Army were organized as "Army Group Ruoff". By July 1942, Ruoff lost the Italian unit. The CSIR was subsumed by the larger Italian Army in Russia (Armata Italiana in Russia, or ARMIR) and transferred to Army Group B (Heeresgruppe B).

During the late summer, as part of Army Group A, Ruoff and the 17th Army attacked towards the Caucasus oilfields. By December, Soviet forces had destroyed the armies defending its flanks (including the ARMIR) and had en-circled the German 6th Army at Stalingrad. Army Group B was withdrawn from southern Russia but Ruoff and the 17th Army were ordered to hold the "Kuban bridgehead." In June 1943, he was moved to the command reserve, and saw no further action during the war.

Serious allegations of war crimes were levied against the 17th Army under Ruoff's command in the 1943 Krasnodar Trial conducted by the military tribunal of the Soviet North Caucasian Front. However, post-war, the Soviet Union did not seek Ruoff's extradition.

Command History
 General Officer Commanding, 4th Panzer Army, Eastern Front - 1942
 General Officer Commanding, 17th Army, Eastern Front - 1942 to 1943

Awards and decorations
 Iron Cross(1914)
 Knight's Cross of the Military Merit Order (Württemberg)
 Knight's Cross, First Class of the Friedrich Order (Württemberg)

 Knight's Cross of the Iron Cross on 30 June 1941 as General der Infanterie and commander of V. Armeekorps

See also 
 Battle of the Caucasus
 Battle of Stalingrad

References

Citations

Bibliography

 
 
 
 
 

1883 births
1967 deaths
People from Hohenlohe (district)
People from the Kingdom of Württemberg
German Army personnel of World War I
Military personnel of Württemberg
Reichswehr personnel
German Army generals of World War II
Colonel generals of the German Army (Wehrmacht)
Recipients of the Knight's Cross of the Iron Cross
Recipients of the clasp to the Iron Cross, 1st class
Military personnel from Baden-Württemberg